Selenic may refer to:
 Selenic acid
 relative to The Moon